Amphipoea lunata is a species of moth in the family Noctuidae first described by Smith in 1891. It is found in North America.

The MONA or Hodges number for Amphipoea lunata is 9455.

References

Further reading

External links
 

Noctuinae
Articles created by Qbugbot
Moths described in 1891